Clear Creek High School is a public secondary institution in the Clear Creek School District in Clear Creek County, Colorado, United States. It serves students in Idaho Springs, Georgetown, Silver Plume, Empire, Berthoud Falls, Dumont, Downieville, Lawson, and parts of Evergreen.  The Colorado 2007-2008 School Accountability Report listed Clear Creek High School as 'high' for overall academic performance on state assessments.

History
Prior to 2002, Clear Creek High School was located in Idaho Springs, in the building that housed both the high school and Clear Creek Middle School. After the construction of the new high school on the top of Floyd Hill near Evergreen, Colorado, the middle school and high school were separated. In January 2009, however, the Clear Creek County School Board decided to move the middle school back in with the high school due to financial concerns. The middle school merged with the high school into the new building in the fall of 2009.

Faculty
Clear Creek High School employed 16 full-time and seven part-time teachers during the 2007–2008 academic year, who had an average of 12 years' teaching experience.

Athletics
Clear Creek High School is a 2A/3A classified athletic school.

The Clear Creek football team competes in the 1A Metro League. The stadium remains in Idaho Springs and can be seen up close from the interstate.

The Clear Creek girls' basketball team competed in the 2A State Championship game for the first time in school history in 2018. Coached by Marc Gorenstein, the team's record was 24–3 at the end of the 2018 season.

Notable alumni

Haleigh Washington (attended), Olympic gold medalist in volleyball.

References

External links

Public high schools in Colorado
School districts established in 2002
Clear Creek County Public Schools (Colorado)
Buildings and structures in Clear Creek County, Colorado
2002 establishments in Colorado